Tibial recurrent artery may refer to:

 Anterior tibial recurrent artery
 Posterior tibial recurrent artery